Lü Yi (呂毅) is a paralympic athlete from China competing mainly in category T37 sprint events.

Lü Yi has twice competed in the 100m, 200m and 400m at the paralympics in both 2000 and 2004 Summer Paralympics but it was in the 2004 games that he won two silver medals as part of the Chinese 4x100 metre and 4x400 metre relay teams.

References

External links
 

Paralympic athletes of China
Athletes (track and field) at the 2000 Summer Paralympics
Athletes (track and field) at the 2004 Summer Paralympics
Paralympic silver medalists for China
Chinese male sprinters
Living people
Medalists at the 2004 Summer Paralympics
Year of birth missing (living people)
Paralympic medalists in athletics (track and field)